This was a new event in the ITF Women's Circuit.

Cristina Dinu and Lina Gjorcheska won the inaugural event, defeating Justyna Jegiołka and Guadalupe Pérez Rojas in the final, 4–6, 6–1, [10–4].

Seeds

Draw

References 
 Draw

Naturtex Women's Open - Doubles